Orthotylus viridinervis is a species of green coloured bug from a family of Miridae that can be found everywhere in Europe except for Albania, Andorra, Croatia, Liechtenstein, Lithuania, Malta, Moldova, North Macedonia, Portugal, and most part of Russia.

References

Insects described in 1856
Hemiptera of Europe
viridinervis